Mistaria lawrencei, synonym Agelena lawrencei, is a species of spider in the family Agelenidae, which contains at least 1,350 species . It was first described by Roewer in 1955 as Agelena lawrencei. It is native to Zimbabwe.

References

Agelenidae
Spiders of Africa
Spiders described in 1955
Endemic fauna of Zimbabwe